Monica Hall is an English guitarist, author and musicologist. A reviewer and writer for The Lute Society (UK) and article contributor to the Lute Society of America Quarterly and Classical Guitar magazine. Hall's main field of study is the baroque guitar and vihuela.

Biography
On completing her music degree at the University of Manchester in 1959; Hall embarked on a career as a music archive librarian most notably for the City of Westminster, London until 1998.

Articles and publications
 Baroque guitar stringing : a survey of the evidence (Guildford:The Lute Society, 2010) 
 Recovering a lost book of guitar music by Corbetta (In Consort : the journal of the Dolmetsch Foundation, Vol. 61 (2005) 
 The "Guitarra espanola" of Joan Carles Amat (In Early Music, Vol. 6, no. 3, July, 1978)
 Dissonance in the guitar music of Francesco Corbetta (In Lute : the journal of the Lute Society, Vol. XLVII (2007) 
 Angiol Bartolotti's Lettere tagliate (In Lute : the journal of the Lute Society, Vol. XLVII (2007) 
 Tuning instructions for the baroque guitar in Bibliothèque Nationale Res. Vmc Ms. 59, f. 108v (In Lute : the journal of the Lute Society, Vol. XLVII (2007)

References

Living people
English women guitarists
English guitarists
English writers about music
Alumni of the University of Manchester
Year of birth missing (living people)